Kevin Robert McNally (born 27 April 1956) is an English actor and writer. He began his acting career in The Spy Who Loved Me (1977), but he is best known for portraying Joshamee Gibbs in the Pirates of the Caribbean film series.

Early life
Born in Bristol, McNally spent his early years in Birmingham, attending Redhill Junior School in Hay Mills and Mapledene Junior School (now Mapledene Primary School) in Sheldon. He went to Central Grammar School for Boys on Gressel Lane in Tile Cross.

Career

McNally's first professional acting work, at age 16, was at the Birmingham Repertory Theatre. In 1973 he received a scholarship to attend the Royal Academy of Dramatic Art where, in 1975, he won the Best Actor Bancroft Gold Medal.

In 1976, he appeared in BBC's I, Claudius and, in 1977, was a regular in the second series of Poldark playing Drake Carne, younger brother of Demelza Poldark. From 1991 to 1994, he wrote nine episodes of Minder, under the pseudonym Kevin Sperring, with writing partner Bernard Dempsey. He also wrote two episodes of Boon, and two episodes of Lock, Stock with Dempsey.

McNally played Joshamee Gibbs in the Pirates of the Caribbean films. He is one of only three actors who appear in all five films, and reprised the role in Kingdom Hearts III, making him the only actor from the film series to reprise a role in Kingdom Hearts.

Along with fellow British actors Ian McNeice and Kenneth Branagh, McNally appeared in two Second World War films, Valkyrie and Conspiracy, that depict behind the scenes activities of high-ranking officials in Nazi Germany.

In 2011, he was cast in the American television series Supernatural as Frank. In 2012, he performed as a voice actor for the best selling videogame Assassin's Creed III, providing the likeness and voice of the character of Robert Faulkner. In 2013, he began working on a science-fiction animation project, Starship Goldfish.

In 2014, he played the lead role in re-recorded radio plays of five lost episodes of Hancock's Half Hour for BBC Radio 4. Following this, a further video episode was re-recorded and broadcast on BBC Four as part of the Lost Sitcoms series.

From 2014 to 2017, McNally played Judge Richard Woodhull of Setauket, Long Island, in the AMC series Turn: Washington's Spies. In July 2019, he guest-starred as Inspector Grandjean in Season 2, Episode 1 of Amazon's mystery series Maigret.

In 2019, McNally portrayed Captain Mainwaring in a series of re-enactments of otherwise lost episodes of the sitcom Dad's Army.

Personal life
He was in a relationship with actor Stevie Harris and they have 2 children together. McNally met actress Phyllis Logan in 1994, and they married in 2011. Their son David was born in 1996. The family lives in Chiswick.

Filmography

Film

Television

Other television credits include: Z-Cars, The Bill, Casualty, The New Statesman and Murder Most Horrid. McNally also co wrote several episodes of the television series Minder and Boon in the 1980s.

Video games

Selected stage roles

References

External links

1956 births
Living people
20th-century English male actors
21st-century English male actors
Alumni of RADA
English male film actors
English male Shakespearean actors
English male stage actors
English male television actors
English male video game actors
English male voice actors
Male actors from Bristol
People from Chiswick